The Delaware Sports Museum and Hall of Fame is a membership-based organization founded in 1976.  The organization runs a museum with exhibits at Daniel S. Frawley Stadium on the Riverfront in Wilmington, Delaware and promotes physical fitness in the community.

The museum is a member of the International Sports Heritage Association.

Gallery

Hall of Fame
An annual awards banquet is also held to recognize athletes who are either from Delaware or perform within the state.  Inductees to the Hall of Fame include:

1970s

1980s

1990s

2000s

2010s

See also
List of museums in Delaware
Mascot Hall of Fame

References

External links
 

Wilmington Riverfront
Museums in Wilmington, Delaware
Sports museums in Delaware
Halls of fame in Delaware
State sports halls of fame in the United States
All-sports halls of fame
International Sports Heritage Association
Awards established in 1976
Museums established in 1976
1976 establishments in Delaware